IIRS may refer to:
 Indian Institute of Remote Sensing, Dehradun
 International Institute of Rehabilitation Sciences and Research, Bhubaneswar